The Wine & Spirit Education Trust, often referred to as WSET, is a global organisation which arranges courses and exams in the field of wine, spirits and sake. WSET was founded in 1969, is headquartered in London and is generally regarded as one of the world's leading providers of wine education. In 2016, it opened its first international office, WSET Asia Pacific, in Hong Kong in response to high demand for wine and spirit education across Greater China.

History and management
WSET grew out of the Wine and Spirit Trade Association Education Committee and was set up with the financial assistance of the Worshipful Company of Vintners. The management of the WSET reports to a Board of Trustees made up of 8 members: three from The Worshipful Company of Vintners, three from the Wine and Spirit Trade Association, one from the Worshipful Company of Distillers and another one from the Institute of Masters of Wine.

Courses

The courses given by WSET were originally intended for people in the wine & spirit trade. The WSET programmes have increasingly been attended also by non-professional connoisseurs. The WSET offers professional certification in more than 70 countries worldwide, the courses are delivered by Approved Programme Providers.

WSET Awards in Wines 

 Level 1 Award in Wines
 Level 2 Award in Wines
 Level 3 Award in Wines
 Level 4 Diploma in Wines

In the past 50 years, there have been over 10,000 WSET Level 4 Diploma graduates. Those who successfully complete the Diploma are able to use the post-nominal “DipWSET” after their name.

WSET Awards in Spirits 

 Level 1 Award in Spirits
 Level 2 Award in Spirits
 Level 3 Award in Spirits

WSET Awards in Sake 

 Level 1 Award in Sake
 Level 3 Award in Sake

Notable alumni 
Notable DipWSETs include:

 Gerard Basset

 Jancis Robinson

 Jasper Morris

 Lisa Perotti-Brown

See also 
 Court of Master Sommeliers
 Master of Wine

References

External links
 Wine & Spirit Education Trust official site
 Wine Business Formation

Education in the London Borough of Southwark
Educational qualifications in the United Kingdom
1969 establishments in the United Kingdom
Hospitality industry in the United Kingdom
Organisations based in the London Borough of Southwark
Organizations established in 1969
Professional titles and certifications
Wine industry organizations
Wine tasting
Wine terminology